Leopold Paul Osborne Fortune-West (born Leopold Paul Osborne West, 9 April 1971) is an English former professional footballer who played as a striker. He played in the Football League for Gillingham, Leyton Orient, Lincoln City, Rotherham United, Brentford, Cardiff City, Doncaster Rovers, Torquay United and Shrewsbury Town.

Fortune-West started his career with Eastern Counties League club Tiptree United, and played for five more non-League clubs before securing a move into the Football League with Gillingham in July 1995. He finished his first season with them as top scorer, and had several short stints with other League clubs before joining Cardiff City, where he played for three seasons. He played for the team as they achieved two promotions, but left on a free transfer.

Fortune-West spent three seasons with Doncaster Rovers, winning promotion in his first, but was released in 2006. He then moved back into non-League football with Rushden & Diamonds, but soon made loan returns to the League with Torquay United and Shrewsbury Town. Fortune-West joined Cambridge United in August 2007 before starting a spell on loan with York City in January 2008. He then had spells further down the pyramid with Alfreton Town, North Ferriby United, Goole and Armthorpe Welfare.

Early and personal life
Fortune-West was born and raised in Stratford, Greater London, and grew up as a supporter of Leyton Orient.  His surname at birth was West, but he later appended his mother's surname to his own surname, as he felt that having the word "fortune" in his name would make him lucky.  He has two nephews who are professional footballers; Clayton Fortune and Jonathan Fortune. Fortune-West married Radmila Cvijetinovic in Tower Hamlets, London in June 1996, and the couple had a child in 2000.

Career

Early career in non-League football
Fortune-West started his football career in non-League football with Tiptree United in the Eastern Counties League aged 17, with whom he played one season, filling the roles of full-back, centre-back and striker. He moved onto Bishop's Stortford and joined Dartford in the season they went out of business. A period at Hendon and then Dagenham & Redbridge followed this before he signed for Stevenage Borough in the Football Conference in 1994. He scored 7 goals in 17 league appearances for Stevenage in 1994–95, after which he moved into the Football League with Gillingham on 12 July 1995. The fee of £5,000 was raised for the cash-strapped club by its Supporters' Club. Becoming a full-time professional necessitated giving up a degree course at the University of Greenwich.

Football League
Fortune-West's first season at Gillingham, 1995–96, saw him score in each of his first three league matches. He was Gillingham's top scorer with 15 goals from 45 appearances, as the club earned promotion to the Second Division as Third Division runners-up. Having made eight appearances and scored three goals for Gillingham during 1996–97, he joined Leyton Orient on loan in March 1997 until the end of the season, making three appearances. He signed for Second Division club Lincoln City on a free transfer in June 1998, and after making 11 appearances and scoring 1 goal, was loaned out to Rotherham United in the Third Division. He scored four goals in five appearances during a one-month loan spell, before Brentford signed him for a £60,000 fee in November 1998. His debut for Brentford came in a 2–1 away defeat to Leyton Orient on 21 November 1998, and scored 1 goal in 15 appearances, before returning to Rotherham for a fee of £35,000 in February 1999.

He scored 8 goals in 17 appearances as Rotherham made the Third Division play-offs, which saw them lose to Leyton Orient in a penalty shoot-out in the semi-final. The 1999–2000 season saw Fortune-West finish as Rotherham's top scorer with 17 goals in 43 appearances, while the club won promotion to the Second Division as Third Division runners-up. After a month into 2000–01, he joined Cardiff City of the Third Division for a fee of £300,000 on 11 September 2000. They earned promotion to the Second Division as Third Division runners-up, and he scored 13 goals from 41 appearances over the season. By the end of the season, Cardiff's rivals Swansea City were believed to be ready to make an attempt at signing Fortune-West. He scored Cardiff's second goal in their play-off semi-final first leg match against Stoke City, which finished as a 2–1 away victory in April 2002. However, after featuring in a 2–0 home defeat in the second leg, Cardiff missed out on making the final, losing 3–2 on aggregate. He finished 2001–02 with 44 appearances and 11 goals. Cardiff qualified for the play-offs in 2002–03 with a sixth-place finish, and were promoted after beating Queens Park Rangers in the final, although Fortune-West was not part of the matchday squad. He was released following this season, in which he made 28 appearances and scored 4 goals.

Bristol Rovers denied that they were interested in signing Fortune-West in June 2003, before Doncaster Rovers of the Third Division signed him on a two-year contract. His first season with the club, 2003–04, saw him score 12 goals in 43 appearances as they won the Third Division championship, earning promotion to the Second Division. During this season, he formed a strike partnership with Gregg Blundell. Fortune-West suffered a knee injury caused by wear and tear to the knee joint in October 2004, which resulted in him undergoing surgery, before returning to the team in March 2005. He was to be offered a new deal in April 2005 and finished the season with 7 goals in 28 appearances. The 2005–06 season was his last with Doncaster, as he was released after scoring 4 goals in 33 appearances.

Rushden & Diamonds and Shrewsbury Town
He returned into non-League football after he signed for Conference National club Rushden & Diamonds in June 2006 on a two-year contract. He joined Torquay United of League Two on loan in September 2006 as cover for the injured Mickey Evans, but was recalled by Rushden due to an injury crisis in early November 2006. He had made five appearances for Torquay. Days later, he signed for another League Two club, Shrewsbury Town, originally on a two-month loan deal. His Shrewsbury debut came as a 60th-minute substitute in a 2–0 away defeat to Milton Keynes Dons on 18 November 2006, after hoping he would be able to play in the FA Cup tie against Hereford United. The loan was extended to the end of 2006–07 in January 2007. Following Shrewsbury's 2–0 home win over Notts County in February 2007, manager Gary Peters referred to Fortune-West as 'Ronseal', as he does "exactly what it says on the tin". His final appearance for Shrewsbury came in the 2007 League Two play-off Final against Bristol Rovers at Wembley Stadium on 26 May 2007, coming on as a substitute in the 80th minute, as Shrewsbury lost 3–1. With the season over, Fortune-West returned to his parent club Rushden, who he left by mutual consent in August 2007.

Return to non-League football

He signed for Conference Premier club Cambridge United in August 2007 after playing for them in a pre-season friendly. He started his Cambridge career by scoring four goals in the first three matches, which included a hat-trick in their 5–1 home victory over Farsley Celtic on 21 August 2007. He was named as the Conference Premier Player of the Month for August 2007. He signed for Conference Premier rivals York City on loan until the end of 2007–08 on 31 January 2008, after which he said he was looking to sign for the club permanently in the summer. He scored on his debut, a 2–0 home win over Grays Athletic after coming on as a 46th-minute substitute for Richard Brodie on 9 February 2008. He started ahead of Brodie in the following matches against Halifax Town and Histon, but struggled during these matches. Cambridge attempted to recall him from his loan in March 2008, but league rules meant that he would not be able to return. He returned to Cambridge following the expiration of his loan spell at York in April 2008, in which he made 13 appearances and scored 2 goals. He featured in Cambridge's play-off semi-final second leg 2–1 home win over Burton Albion; this result meant the team reached the final 4–3 on aggregate. He came on for the last 15 minutes of the final against Exeter City at Wembley Stadium on 18 May 2008, but Cambridge lost 1–0. He was released by the club in May 2008 after making 33 appearances and scoring 8 goals.

On 11 June 2008, Fortune-West joined Conference North club Alfreton Town on a one-year contract for 2008–09. He made his debut in a 3–2 home victory over Hyde United on 9 August 2008 and scored two headers late on in the following match, a 2–2 away draw with Solihull Moors. He scored a 61st-minute equaliser with a close range header at home to Bury Town in the FA Cup first round on 8 November 2008, bringing the score to 2–2, which eventually finished as a 4–2 victory, seeing Alfreton progress to the second round. After struggling to affirm a place in the team, he was released by Alfreton on 28 January 2009. He signed for North Ferriby United of the Northern Premier League Premier Division, and made his debut as a 65th-minute substitute in a 4–0 away defeat to Nantwich Town on 28 February 2009. Fortune-West joined Northern Premier League Division One South club Goole in July 2009, debuting in a 1–1 home draw with Carlton Town on 15 August 2009. In November 2010, he joined Northern Counties East League Premier Division club Armthorpe Welfare. He became player-manager of Armthorpe in May 2012, following the resignation of long-term boss Des Bennett. He resigned from this position on 4 April 2013 before retiring from football.

Style of play
Fortune-West played as a striker and had a "no-nonsense physical style".

Career statistics

Honours
Doncaster Rovers
Football League Third Division: 2003–04

References

External links

1971 births
Living people
Footballers from Stratford, London
English footballers
Association football forwards
Tiptree United F.C. players
Bishop's Stortford F.C. players
Dartford F.C. players
Hendon F.C. players
Dagenham & Redbridge F.C. players
Stevenage F.C. players
Gillingham F.C. players
Leyton Orient F.C. players
Lincoln City F.C. players
Rotherham United F.C. players
Brentford F.C. players
Cardiff City F.C. players
Doncaster Rovers F.C. players
Rushden & Diamonds F.C. players
Torquay United F.C. players
Shrewsbury Town F.C. players
Cambridge United F.C. players
York City F.C. players
Alfreton Town F.C. players
North Ferriby United A.F.C. players
Goole A.F.C. players
Armthorpe Welfare F.C. players
Isthmian League players
National League (English football) players
English Football League players
Northern Premier League players
Northern Counties East Football League players
English football managers
Armthorpe Welfare F.C. managers
Association football player-managers
Black British sportspeople
Alumni of the University of Greenwich